The University of Saskatchewan Graduate Students' Association (GSA-uSask or UofS-GSA) is the university-wide representative body for graduate students at the University of Saskatchewan, located in Saskatoon, Saskatchewan, Canada. It was established in 1985 as an office inside the University of Saskatchewan Students' Union (USSU), but it became an independent body only in 1992. Its head office is located at 1337 College Drive in the Emmanuel and St. Chad. The College of Emmanuel and St. Chad was designed by Webster, Forrester and Scott of Saskatoon and constructed in 1965 and 1966.

"The GSA Commons is located on Treaty 6 Territory and the Homeland of the Métis, and we pay our respect to the First Nations and Métis ancestors of this place and reaffirm our relationship with one another."

History
In 1883 by an Act of Parliament, Emmanuel College was incorporated as “The University of Saskatchewan.” 

In 1984-85, it was created inside the USSU (University of Saskatchewan Students' Union) a group to handle issues specifically related to graduate students in the University of Saskatchewan.

In 1992, this group became an independent body, called University of Saskatchewan Graduate Students' Association. The GSA-uSask is a not-for-profit student organization that provides services, events, student clubs and advocacy work to the graduate students of University of Saskatchewan.

In the fall of 2006, the Emmanuel and St. Chad space earmarked for GSA-uSask.

Since 2016-17, the GSA is pleading for a seat on the U of S Board of Governors. The Board is responsible for overseeing matters on management, administration and control of the university's property and financial affairs. Currently, the U of S is the only university in the U15 group that doesn't have a seat for graduate students on the Board. Although changes on the composition of the Board depends on University of Saskatchewan Act's amendments (within the scope of the Provincial Legislature), recent support by the University Council is an indication that not only the graduate students consider this an important cause. In 2021, amid the COVID-19 pandemic, the GSA and the PSAC Local 40004 — which represents U of S graduate students who work as teaching, research and student assistants — created a petition to oppose the tuition increase proposed by the U of S. Another increase to the differential rate of 14.6%, from 1.58 to 1.81, will affect more the international student. The projected tuition for this group will rise from $2,243 to $2,698.71 — a difference of about 20%.

GSA Commons
Since 2007, Emmanuel and St. Chad Chapel holds the GSA-uSask headquarters, also referred as GSA Commons. The chapel was de-consecrated by a multi-faith opening ceremony.

Governance
The governance of the University of Saskatchewan Graduate Students' Association is shared among three bodies: the executive committee; the Council; and the Board of Directors.
 Executive committee: members of the University of Saskatchewan Graduate Students' Association elected by their peers for a one-year-long term of office.
 GSA Council: composed of Academic Units' representatives, chosen in their Departments by their own rules. All graduate programs should have at least one representative in the monthly GSA Council meetings.
 Board of Directors: Defined in the GSA Bylaws.

Academic Units

 Engineering Graduate Community Council (EGCC), College of Engineering
 Indigenous Graduate Students' Council (IGSC)
 Physics and Engineering Physics GSA Council at the U of S (PEGASUS), College of Engineering
 Saskatchewan Agricultural Graduates Association (SAGA), College of Agriculture and Bioresources
 Soil Science GSA, College of Agriculture and Bioresources
 WCVM GSA, Western College of Veterinary Medicine

Student Clubs
The student clubs in the University of Saskatchewan may be ratified by the USSU and/or ratified by the GSA.
Among the several student clubs in this University, there are those related to cultural backgrounds (students from other countries), professional associations, sustainability groups, religious studies, sports and many more.

Offered Services
 Health and Dental Plan 
 U-Pass 
 Bursaries 
 ISIC Cards

Previous Executive Members

References

External links
 
 University of Saskatchewan

Graduate Students' Association
Students' associations in Canada